John James "Jack" Harris  (born October 27, 1948) is a former Canadian lawyer and politician from Newfoundland and Labrador. Harris served as the New Democratic Party (NDP) Member of Parliament for St. John's East. He represented the riding from 1987 to 1988 and again from 2008 to 2015, when he was defeated. He won the seat again in the 2019 federal election, becoming the only NDP member of the House of Commons from Atlantic Canada. He retired from politics in 2021. Harris is also the former leader of the Newfoundland and Labrador New Democratic Party (1992-2006).

Politics

Harris first became a member of the House of Commons of Canada after winning a by-election in the riding of St. John's East on July 20, 1987. Harris was the second NDP candidate ever elected to the House of Commons in Newfoundland and Labrador. He was subsequently defeated in the 1988 federal election.

NL NDP Leader
Harris was elected to the Newfoundland and Labrador House of Assembly in a 1990 by-election and was unopposed when he was elected to succeed Cle Newhook as leader of the provincial New Democrats at a party convention held November 1992. He was re-elected to the Legislature in the 1993, 1996, 1999, and 2003 elections.

In 1997, Harris ran for Mayor of St. John's losing narrowly to Andy Wells. He was supported by Danny Williams in this election who had a public dispute with Wells regarding a strike in 1994.

Harris retired from provincial politics in 2006 and was succeeded by Lorraine Michael as leader of the party as well as the Member of the House of Assembly for Signal Hill-Quidi Vidi. At the time of his departure, his former law partner Danny Williams was Premier of Newfoundland and Labrador.

Federal politics
In the 2008 federal election Harris was again elected as the Member of Parliament for the riding of St. John's East. He received 74.1% of the vote, which was the fifth highest winning percentage in the election. Following the election Harris was appointed as the party's Critic for National Defence, and on several occasions has been named one of "The Backbench Top Ten", for his performance in the House of Commons, by Maclean's Magazine. Harris was re-elected in the 2011 federal election. He lost the 2015 election in an upset to Liberal Party candidate Nick Whalen.

In May 2019, Harris successfully sought the NDP nomination for St. John's East for the 2019 federal election. Harris defeated Whalen in the 2019 election to regain his old seat. Harris did not run in the 2021 federal election.

Electoral history

References

External links
 Website for Jack Harris, Member of Parliament, St. John's East

 Jack Harris Facebook page
 Jack Harris on CPAC, Beyond Politics
 Jack Harris' press conference on student loan interest rates (Youtube video)

1948 births
Canadian King's Counsel
Lawyers in Newfoundland and Labrador
Leaders of the Newfoundland and Labrador NDP/CCF
Living people
Members of the House of Commons of Canada from Newfoundland and Labrador
New Democratic Party MPs
Newfoundland and Labrador New Democratic Party MHAs
Politicians from St. John's, Newfoundland and Labrador
21st-century Canadian politicians